TMSR may be used as an acronym in:

Electricity networks
 Ten Minute Spinning Reserve

Entertainment
 Tera Mera Saath Rahe, 2021 Indian television drama series
 Tera Mera Saath Rahen, 2001 Indian drama film
 The Most Serene Republic, Canadian indie rock music group

Medicine
 Targeted Muscle and Sensory Reinnervation, an approach in Neuroprosthetics

Nuclear power (Thorium Molten Salt Reactor)
 TMSR research project of the Chinese Academy of Sciences
 TMSR-LF1 prototype in the Chinese province of Gansu
 ThorCon nuclear reactor TMSR-500 being developed for Indonesia

Sports
 Team Moto Sport Racing, a Spanish motorcycle racing group founded in 1995

United States Navy
 Torpedoman's Mate Seaman Recruit, a now-disestablished rating

Acronyms